Judge Robb may refer to:

Charles Henry Robb (1867–1939), associate justice of the United States Court of Appeals for the District of Columbia
Roger Robb (1907–1985), judge of the United States Court of Appeals for the District of Columbia Circuit

See also
Clair E. Robb (1905–1965), justice of the Kansas Supreme Court